Godzilla is a novel series written by author Marc Cerasini based on the film series's characters. While all set within the same continuity (a unique continuity in which only the first Godzilla film has taken place), each novel has its own plot and storyline, with Toho's kaiju featured as the stars.

Godzilla Returns
Godzilla Returns is the first novel, with Godzilla reappearing for the first time since 1954, rampaging and destroying the city of Tokyo. The book is clearly set to follow Godzilla, King of the Monsters! (the English version of the original Godzilla film), as Steve Martin (Raymond Burr's character) is said to have been present during the original attack. The finale of the novel is similar to the 1984 film The Return of Godzilla, as Godzilla is drawn away from the city using a lure identical to the one used in that film. However, the lure is used to draw Godzilla to the deepest part of the ocean, rather than a volcano.

Godzilla 2000
In the second novel, Godzilla 2000 (not to be confused with the film of the same name), the United States government forms a new organization, G-Force, dedicated to stopping the attacks of giant monsters, especially Godzilla. Meanwhile, a meteor shower threatens mankind with extinction. The initial wave delivers a parasitic alien organism to Earth, which bonds with a praying mantis to form a swarm of gigantic creatures dubbed Kamacuras. Soon after, another monster, Varan, surfaces in Mexico. A gigantic pteranodon, actually a female Rodan, emerges from the North Pole and builds a nest on Mount Rushmore. And Godzilla itself surfaces off the coast of California, ultimately crossing the United States and arriving in New York City on January 1, 2000. There, it is finally revealed that it has been led there by Mothra, the Protector of the Earth, to destroy the dreaded King Ghidorah, the three-headed space dragon who emerged from one of the asteroids approaching Earth. The monsters battle and Godzilla defeats Ghidorah and drives it away, severing Ghidorah's middle head in the process.

Godzilla at World's End
In the third novel, Godzilla at World's End, a new threat emerges from within the Earth itself a year after Godzilla's battle with King Ghidorah. An ancient civilization, long dead and buried beneath Antarctica, springs to life with the arrival of a teenage girl from the surface world, who becomes corrupted by the power she finds there and seeks to destroy mankind, unleashing five new monsters: Gigan, Megalon, Manda, Battra and Hedorah. Her ultimate weapons are the Babel Wave that cuts off all communications and the plant monster Biollante. With the help of a group of teenage scientists, Mothra, a young Rodan (the one that hatched from the egg on Mount Rushmore), and the newly awakened Anguirus, Godzilla makes it to the city in the earth. During the trip, Gigan, Hedorah, and Battra are supposedly killed while Manda and Megalon flee into the wild. Godzilla and Biollante have a final battle with Godzilla winning, saving the earth. However, Godzilla becomes trapped in the Earth's center. As the book ends, the Russian government shows interest in studying Anguirus while America and Japan work together on a new project. It is then revealed that Manda and Megalon are still at large along with Rodan.

Godzilla vs. the Robot Monsters
Godzilla emerges from a volcano in the year 2004. Meanwhile, America, Russia and Mongolia have each been hard at work on their own anti-monster projects: Mechagodzilla, Moguera and Mecha-King Ghidorah, respectively. In Montana, Mechagodzilla is pitted against Baragon, who has emerged from hibernation to feed on humans and herds of cattle alike, while Moguera defeats and captures Anguirus in Russia. Ghidorah, on the other hand, is in the hands of a corrupt Kulgan Khan, the new ruler of Mongolia, who intends to use the rebuilt space dragon as a weapon of conquest. In the climax of the novel, Godzilla escapes from the bottom of the Earth and returns to Japan to do battle with his old foe, unwittingly teaming up with Mechagodzilla and Moguera in the process. However, the only survivor of the fight is Godzilla itself. In the end, Godzilla returns to the sea, Anguirus is moved to a wildlife sanctuary for study, Rodan returns to Antarctica, and Baragon escapes, albeit trapped underground temporarily.

Lost project
The final book, Godzilla and the Lost Continent, was set for a 1999 release, but was never published supposedly due to the loss of Random House's license; however, the author Marc Cerasini stated that the real reason was fallout from Sony's 1998 Godzilla movie. The summary given in the previous book reveals that a new continent would rise from the Pacific, with several nations laying claim to it, but that it would also harbor great danger: Varan, Manda and Battra now call this continent home, as well as a new monster and a previously unknown civilization. The King of the Monsters resurfaces to do battle with this threat. The unknown monster that was to be the villain of the book - and its name (if any) - have never been revealed. Its identity is heavily debated amongst fans. As it turned out, it was to be a giant that was made out of stone and rock named either Raijin or Daitengu. Furthermore, Raijin/Daitengu would have actually been the herald and champion for a even more powerful intelligence, namely the Earth itself, which not only rose the lost continent and summoned all the monsters to it, but also possessed Biollante to serve as its avatar, as well as creating equally monstrous forest growth which soon appears all over the world, in a catastrophic bid to cleanse itself of all human life. Now Godzilla is the only hope for both mankind and the inhabitants of the Lost Continent against these two sentient literal forces of nature.

Series
 Godzilla Returns (1996)
 Godzilla 2000 (1997)
 Godzilla at World's End (1998)
 Godzilla vs. the Robot Monsters (1999)
 Godzilla and the Lost Continent (written and finished in 1999, but left unpublished)

Novel series
Godzilla (franchise)
Books based on films
Novels based on films